SV Lippstadt is a German association football club from the city of Lippstadt, North Rhine-Westphalia.



History

The two predecessors of the current-day club were both established in March 1908. Borussia Lippstadt was founded 24 March by students of the Gymnasium Ostendorf, while Lippstädter SV Teutonia was also founded sometime late in the month. Teutonia merged with SV Westfalia Lippstadt in 1921 and established a ground at Waldschlößchen that same year. This club played briefly in the top-flight regional league in 1931–33 until a general re-organization of German football under the Third Reich into sixteen first division Gauliga in 1933 saw then shuffled down to second-level competition.

Late in World War II Teutonia and SV Borussia Lippstadt played alongside Luftwaffe Sportverein Lipperbruchbaumas as part of the combined wartime side, or Kriegspielgemeinshaft, KSG Lippstadt. This team was inserted into the crumbling first division Gauliga Westfalen/Group 3 but never played a league match as war overtook the area. Following the conflict, occupying Allied authorities ordered the dissolution of organizations across the country, including sports and football clubs.

Both Borussia and Teutonia were re-established as separate sides after the war and in 1957 finished one-two competing against each other in the Landesliga Westfalen (III). Borussia was promoted directly into Verbandsliga Westfalen, while Teutonia also advanced after winning its way through a promotion playoff. Both sides were quickly sent down with the former playing only a single season at that level, while the latter played two seasons. For the most part over the next few decades the two clubs were up and down between the city and district circuits. They both enjoyed stints in the Verbandsliga beginning in the mid-70s, while Teutonia spent the first half of the 80s in the Oberliga.

Teutonia emerged from the Landesliga Westfalen (VI) and into the Verbandsliga Westfalen (V) in 1994. A merger in 1997 united the two clubs to create SV Lippstadt 08 and the new team earned promotion to the Oberliga Westfalen (IV) on the strength of a second-place result in the 1997–98 season. Their play has been uneven since their arrival into the country's highest amateur league. After earning top three finishes in their first two seasons at that level Lippstadt has since generally ended in the lower half of the table, including a close brush with relegation in 2005 but it remained in the league until the Oberliga Westfalen was disbanded in 2008.

Not strong enough to compete in the new NRW-Liga the club played in the Westfalenliga until 2012 when a league championship took it back up to the now reformed Oberliga Westfalen. A league championship in the Oberliga in 2013 earned it promotion to the tier four Regionalliga West but it was relegated from this level after only one season. It returned to the Regionalliga West in 2018 after again winning the Oberliga Westfalen.

Honours
The club's honours:
 Oberliga Westfalen
 Champions: 2012–13, 2017–18
 Westfalenliga – Group 1
 Champions: 2011–12

Current players

Famous players

 Karl-Heinz Rummenigge, came up through the youth system of Borussia Lippstadt before joining Bayern Munich and going on to play for the German national side
 Daniel Farke, played for SV Lippstadt for 3 stints during his career before managing the club, and later going on to manage English club Norwich City in the Premier League.

References

External links
Official team site
Das deutsche Fußball-Archiv historical German football league tables 

Football clubs in Germany
Football clubs in North Rhine-Westphalia
Association football clubs established in 1997
1997 establishments in Germany